Concha Catalá (1881-1968) was a Spanish actress of Basque heritage and a pioneer of early Spanish theater in the early twentieth century.

Early life 

Concepción García Paz Catalá was born on 11 February 1880 in Bilbao, Spain. Her father was a band leader and as a child, she moved with her family to Madrid. She studied at the French school of San Luis in Madrid and then moved to the Conservatory to study piano.

Career 

Her professional debut occurred in 1900, in the play Los Galeotes at the Teatro de la Comedia in Madrid in the theater troupe of actress . The following year, she performed in Las flores with the Quintero brothers.

Though she made a few films, Una morena y una rubia (1933), Suspiros de España (1939) and Su hermano y él (1941), Catalá was primarily a stage actress.

Recognition 

In 1948, she received the Medal of Order of Alfonso X the Wise. Her last performance was of Pemán's play Doña Clarines in the 1962–1963 season at the Teatro Recoletos in Madrid.

Catalá died in Madrid on 3 July 1968.

References 

1881 births
1968 deaths
Spanish stage actresses
Spanish film actresses